Cartilaginous joints are connected entirely by cartilage (fibrocartilage or hyaline).  Cartilaginous joints allow more movement between bones than a fibrous joint but less than the highly mobile synovial joint.  Cartilaginous joints also forms the growth regions of immature long bones and the intervertebral discs of the spinal column.


Primary cartilaginous joints 
Primary cartilaginous joints are known as "synchondrosis". These bones are connected by hyaline cartilage and sometimes occur between ossification centers. This cartilage may ossify with age.

Some examples of primary cartilaginous joints in humans are the "growth plates" between ossification centers in long bones. These joints here allow for only a little movement, such as in the spine or ribs.

Secondary cartilaginous joints

Secondary cartilaginous joints are known as "symphysis". These include fibrocartilaginous and hyaline joints, which usually occur at the midline.

Some examples of secondary cartilaginous joints in human anatomy would be the manubriosternal joint (between the manubrium and the body of the sternum), intervertebral discs, and the pubic symphysis.

Articulating bones at a symphysis are covered with hyaline cartilage and have a thick, fairly compressible pad of fibrocartilage between them. Cartilaginous joints allow little movement, as summarized above.

References

Joints